Steven Turner (born October 17, 1946) is an American former professional tennis player.

Raised in Greenwich Village, Manhattan, Turner turned professional at the age of 23, competing on the international tour for seven years during the 1970s. He registered a career high singles ranking of 105 in the world.

Turner, who is Jewish, is a scholar of Kabbalah, an esoteric system of Jewish mystic thought. He is a tennis pro in Manhattan and has a noticeable appearance, wearing his hair in two clumped dreadlocks, as a Jewish mystical vow.

References

External links
 
 

1946 births
Living people
American male tennis players
Jewish tennis players
Tennis people from New York (state)
Sportspeople from Manhattan
People from Greenwich Village
Kabbalists